Joseph Haughton (1833 – 27 May 1908) was a New Zealand cricketer. He played in one first-class match for Wellington in 1876/77.

See also
 List of Wellington representative cricketers

References

External links
 

1833 births
1908 deaths
New Zealand cricketers
Wellington cricketers
Cricketers from Plymouth, Devon